Omm ol Gharib-e Bozorg (also Romanized as Omm ol Gharīb-e Bozorg; also known as Ommé Gharibehé Bozorg, Omm ol Gharīb, Omm ol Qarīb, and Omm-ol Qarīd) is a village in Veys Rural District, Veys District, Bavi County, Khuzestan Province, Iran. At the 2006 census, its population was 203, in 26 families.

References 

Populated places in Bavi County